Mick O'Loughlin (born 1945 in Kanturk, County Cork) is an Irish former sportsperson. He played Gaelic football with his local club Kanturk and later Bishopstown GAA and was a member of the Cork senior inter-county team from 1960 until 1969.

References

1945 births
Living people
Kanturk Gaelic footballers
Cork inter-county Gaelic footballers
Munster inter-provincial Gaelic footballers